The Microregion of Novo Horizonte is located on the north of São Paulo state, Brazil, and is made up of 6 municipalities. It belongs to the Mesoregion of São José do Rio Preto.

The microregion has a population of 79,222 inhabitants, in an area of 2,435.1 km²

Municipalities 
The microregion consists of the following municipalities, listed below with their 2010 Census populations (IBGE/2010):

Irapuã:  7,275
Itajobi: 14,556
Marapoama:  2,633
Novo Horizonte: 36,593
Sales: 5,451
Urupês: 12,714

References

Novo Horizonte